James Hays Eckhouse (born February 14, 1955) is an American actor, best known for playing Jim Walsh on Beverly Hills, 90210. He also directed three episodes of the show.

Career 
Before his part on Beverly Hills, 90210, Eckhouse had small roles in such films as Trading Places, Fatal Attraction, Big and Cocktail. He was a series regular on Beverly Hills, 90210 from the pilot episode in 1990 until the end of the fifth season in 1995. He also co-starred in 1999's Judgement Day.

Personal life
Eckhouse studied briefly at MIT before beginning his acting career. He and his wife have two sons.

Filmography

Film

Television

References

External links
 
 
 

1955 births
Male actors from Chicago
American male film actors
American male stage actors
American male television actors
American television directors
Living people
20th-century American male actors
21st-century American male actors